Jim Cassidy may refer to:

 Jim Cassidy (actor), American pornographic actor and model
 Jim Cassidy (coach), former Australian rules football coach
 Jim Cassidy (footballer) (1869–?), Scottish football player
 Jim Cassidy (jockey) (born 1963), New Zealand jockey

See also
 James Cassidy (disambiguation)